The 1963–64 FAW Welsh Cup is the 77th season of the annual knockout tournament for competitive football teams in Wales.

Key
League name pointed after clubs name.
CCL - Cheshire County League
FL D2 - Football League Second Division
FL D3 - Football League Third Division
FL D4 - Football League Fourth Division
SFL - Southern Football League
WLN - Welsh League North

Fifth round
Ten winners from the Fourth round and six new clubs.

Sixth round

Semifinal
Newport County and Cardiff City played at Swansea, replay were held it Cardiff, Bangor City and Wrexham played at Chester.

Final

External links
The FAW Welsh Cup

1963-64
Wales
Cup